Parizhskaya Kommuna is a rural locality (a khutor) in Lychakskoye Rural Settlement, Frolovsky District, Volgograd Oblast, Russia. The population was 2 as of 2010.

Geography 
Parizhskaya Kommuna is located in center of Frolovsky District, 32 km northeast of Prigorodny (the district's administrative centre) by road. Blagodatny is the nearest rural locality.

References 

Rural localities in Frolovsky District